Kendall Lewis Walton (born 1939) is an American philosopher, the Emeritus Charles Stevenson Collegiate Professor of Philosophy and Professor of Art and Design at the University of Michigan. His work mainly deals with theoretical questions about the arts and issues of philosophy of mind, metaphysics, and philosophy of language. His book Mimesis as Make Believe: On the Foundations of the Representational Arts develops a theory of make-believe and uses it to understand the nature and varieties of representation in the arts. He has also developed an account of photography as transparent, defending the idea that we see through photographs, much as we see through telescopes or mirrors, and written extensively on pictorial representation, fiction and the emotions, the ontological status of fictional entities, the aesthetics of music, metaphor, and aesthetic value.

Education and career
Walton studied as an undergraduate at the University of California, Berkeley, originally pursuing a major in music, having been a serious musician, probably headed towards music theory. 
However, a philosophy course in his sophomore year convinced him to change his major, tentatively, from music to philosophy. After a few more courses, he became convinced he had found his calling, stating that he had always been “more or less hooked” on philosophy, despite not knowing it by that name.

Because of his background in music, Walton expected that he would have an interest in aesthetics and philosophy of art, but was unmoved by his contacts with these fields at Berkeley. After graduating in 1961, he pursued postgraduate studies at Cornell University where he attended a seminar with the British philosopher and aesthetician Frank Sibley that he discovered “how exciting aesthetics can be, how serious, rigorous philosophical thought can connect with real, real-world interests in the arts.” He wrote his dissertation, 'Conceptual Schemes: A Study of Linguistic Relativity and Related Philosophical Problems', with Sydney Shoemaker on philosophy of language, mind and metaphysics, and graduated in 1967 with a Ph.D.

After having been invited to teach a course on aesthetics that he was not fully prepared for (having only had the one seminar with Sibley), he stayed up nearly all night brainstorming topics, which led to his paper 'Categories of Art'. Recognizing that the analytic tradition had not explored aesthetics at the time, he was drawn to the idea of being a pioneer, staying “That is more fun, for me, than fine tuning ideas others have worked on for decades or centuries. And I don’t have to leave behind my interests in music and the other arts”

He joined the University of Michigan faculty in 1965, and became Charles L. Stevenson Collegiate Professor in 1999. He was elected as a Fellow of the American Academy of Arts and Sciences in 1998, and received an honorary doctorate from the University of Nottingham in 2005. He was president of the American Society for Aesthetics from 2003 to 2005.

Philosophical work

Make-believe theory
Walton's major contribution to philosophy is his theory of representation, known as the make-believe theory. In the context of ontology, the same theory is usually referred to as pretense theory, and in the context of representational arts, prop theory. Walton has been working on this philosophical theory since 1973, and it is expounded in his 1990 magnum opus Mimesis as Make -Believe: On the Foundations of the Representational Arts. The theory is a development of Ernst Gombrich's sketched ideas concerning the relationship between toys and art, presented in his famous essay 'Meditations on a Hobby Horse', which Walton has described as having been “largely ignored” by most of philosophy of art. and suggested that styles in art can be understood by comparison to the adjective qualities we attach to the actions that artists apparently took in making a work of art.

Additionally, he has developed a transparency thesis of photography, which is summarized in the following claim: “Photographs are transparent. We see the world through them.” Walton recognizes that this use of 'see' may differ from its conventional usage, but considers it parallel to the way we talk about 'seeing' through a telescope or other such tool. In viewing a photograph, we thus have two related experiences: we see through the photograph to the circumstances it was originally taken, and we have a fictional experience using the photograph as a prop e.g. if one looks at a photograph of Aunt Mabel grimacing one may say “Aunt Mabel is grimacing” - it is fictional that one sees her grimacing, but in addition one actually sees through the photograph an actual grimace that she had on her face in the past.

Books
Mimesis as Make-Believe: On the Foundations of the Representational Arts.  Cambridge, Mass.: Harvard University Press, 1990.
Marvelous Images: On Values and the Arts.  Oxford & New York: Oxford University Press, 2008.
In Other Shoes: Music, Metaphor, Empathy, Existence.  Oxford & New York: Oxford University Press, 2015.

References

External links
 
 Interview at Only a Game
 Animated short summarizing Walton's theory of representation

1939 births
Living people
UC Berkeley College of Letters and Science alumni
Cornell University alumni
University of Michigan faculty
20th-century American philosophers
21st-century American philosophers
Philosophers of art
Philosophers of mind
Metaphysicians
Philosophers of language
Ontologists